Ulrich Eberl (born 1962 in Regensburg, Germany) is a science and technology journalist. After four years as a journalist, he took a position with Diemler from 1992 to 1995 working on their technology publications. In 1995, he took a position as Director of Siemens' worldwide innovation communications. He has also been Editor in Chief of the magazine Pictures of the Future since 2001. He is the author of several books, including 2011's Life in 2050.

References

1962 births
German male journalists
Living people
Writers from Regensburg
German male writers